Mária Kolíková is a Slovak politician who currently serves as the justice minister of Slovakia; she was nominated by Za ľudí. She is working on reforming the judiciary system and reducing corruption by investigating corrupt justices and improving public trust in the judiciary. Kolíková previously worked in the Justice Ministry when Lucia Žitňanská was minister. In 2021, after several disagreements with the leader Veronika Remišová Kolíková left For the people. Now she figures as a nominee of Freedom and Solidarity (SaS) and entered the party as a member in June 2022. In September 2022, she resigned along with other SAS ministers due to disagreements with political decisions of Igor Matovič and returned to the Parliament where she joined the Freedom and Solidarity caucus.

References

Living people
Justice ministers of Slovakia
Female justice ministers
Women government ministers of Slovakia
1974 births
People from Dunajská Streda
Comenius University alumni
Members of the National Council (Slovakia) 2020-present
Female members of the National Council (Slovakia)